Francis Edward Gilman (April 11, 1842 – May 24, 1917) was a Canadian politician.

Born in Danville, Canada East, Gilman studied at McGill University before being called to the Bar of Lower Canada in 1865. He received a Doctor of Law degree in 1877 and was created a Queen's Counsel in 1885. A lawyer, he practised law in Montreal. He ran unsuccessfully as the Liberal candidate for the Legislative Assembly of Quebec for Argenteuil in 1881 losing to William Owens. He was appointed to the Legislative Council of Quebec for Wellington in 1887. He served until his death in 1917 in Westmount, Quebec.

References

1842 births
1917 deaths
Canadian King's Counsel
Lawyers in Quebec
McGill University alumni
People from Estrie
Quebec Liberal Party MLCs
McGill University Faculty of Law alumni